Unit, which labels itself as the Norwegian "directorate for ICT and joint services in higher education and research", is the  within the Ministry of Education and Research which provides governance of and access to shared information and communications technology (ICT) services. Unit was created on January 1, 2018, following a merger of BIBSYS,  and parts of Uninett.

See also
National Library of Norway
Open access in Norway
Project DEAL

References

Further reading

External links

2018 establishments in Norway
Government agencies established in 2018